Kopecky are a progressive rock instrumental band of three brothers based in Racine, Wisconsin who combine a number of elements including metal, classical, pop, eastern music and fusion together to create a unique sound.  Since their inception in 1997, their intense music is characterized by virtuoso musicianship, soaring melodies, and dark-tinged experimentation.

The band members (brothers) are:
 William Kopecky, 4 string fretless and 6 string fretted basses, keyboards, and sitar
 Joe Kopecky, 6 and 7 string electric guitars
 Paul Kopecky (d. June 22, 2009), acoustic and electronic percussion

Discography
 Kopecky (Mellow Records/Italy, Self-released/USA 1999)
 Serpentine Kaleidoscope (Cyclops Records/England 2000)
 Orion A Live Performance (M.A.C.E. Music 2001)
 Sunset Gun (Musea Records 2003)
 Blood (Unicorn Digital 2006)

American progressive rock groups
Unicorn Digital artists